Peter J. Kitson is a British academic and author. He is a Professor of Romantic Literature and Culture at the University of East Anglia where he teaches and researches the literature and culture of the British Romantic era.

Career
His doctoral thesis at the University of Hull was on 'The Seventeenth-century Influence on the Early Religious and Political Thought of S. T. Coleridge, 1790-1805'. Kitson has authored and edited many books and articles on Romantic period literature, and the global contexts of romantic writing, including theories of race, slavery, and empire. Recently, he has been working extensively on Sino British cultural relations. His publications include the important Forging Romantic China: Sino-British Cultural Relations 1760--1840, (Cambridge University Press, 2014) and the multi-volume edition Slavery, Abolition and Emancipation: Writings in the British Romantic Period (Pickering & Chatto, 1998), which provided modern readers with a substantial body of eighteenth-century writings about race and slavery. He has received numerous research awards, including awards from the Leverhulme Trust, the Arts and Humanities Research Council, the British Academy, and the Carnegie Trust. He has been awarded research fellowships from the Huntington Library, the Japan Society for the Promotion of Science, and the Humanities Research Centre of the Australian National University. Professor Kitson has been elected as both Chair then President of the English Association and President of the British Association of Romantic Studies. He is an Honorary fellow of both associations. He also served as Head of School of English at UEA, the University of Dundee and the University of Wales, Bangor.

Publications

 (Edited with Brycchan Carey)

 (Edited with Tim Fulford and Debbie Lee)

 (Edited with Debbie Lee)

 (Edited with Tim Fulford)

 (Edited with Thomas N. Corns)

References

Living people
Alumni of the University of Hull
Academics of the University of East Anglia
Fellows of the English Association
Year of birth missing (living people)